Anthony Carl Tommasini (born April 14, 1948) is an American music critic and author who specializes in classical music. Described as "a discerning critic, whose taste, knowledge and judgment have made him a must-read", Tommasini was the chief classical music critic for The New York Times from 2000 to 2021. Also a pianist, he has released two CDS and two books on the music of his colleague and mentor, the composer and critic Virgil Thomson.

A classical music enthusiast since his youth, Tommasini attended both Yale University and Boston University to study piano, and then taught music at Emerson College. In 1986 he left academia to write music criticism for The Boston Globe. Tommasini joined the Times in 1996 and became their chief classical music critic in 2000 for over two decades. He traveled to cover important premieres of contemporary classical music, encouraged diversity in both classical repertoire and ensembles, and wrote books covering influential operas and composers.

Early life and education
Anthony Carl Tommasini was born in Brooklyn, New York on April 14, 1948. He grew up in a family of five in Malverne on Long Island, New York. Though his parents were not musically inclined, Tommasini was interested in classical music from a young age. Beginning piano lessons in his youth, at 16 years of age he won a piano competition at The Town Hall in Manhattan, performing a Mozart concerto. From age 15 on, he regularly attended the Metropolitan Opera, with operas by Puccini being particular favorites. Other impressionable performances included Joan Sutherland as Lucia in Donizetti's Lucia di Lammermoor; Birgit Nilsson as the title role of Puccini's Turandot; Renata Tebaldi as Mimì in Puccini's La bohème; and Leontyne Price as the title role of Verdi's Aida. From his teens, Tommasini also cites a performance of Leonard Bernstein conducting the New York Philharmonic in Beethoven's Symphony No. 3 and Stravinsky's The Rite of Spring as particularly inspirational. He was a fan of the pianist Rudolf Serkin, whose recitals he frequently attended, and was overwhelmed by Igor Stravinsky conducting the Symphony of Psalms at the Lincoln Center. A graduate of Saint Paul's School in Garden City, New York, Tommasini studied piano with Donald Currier at Yale University, receiving a Bachelor of Arts (1970) and a Master of Music (1972). He subsequently earned a Doctor of Musical Arts (1982) from Boston University, during which he studied with the pianist Leonard Shure. A decade later, he won the 1998 Boston University School of Music Distinguished Alumni Award.

Career
Based in Boston, Tommasini taught music at Emerson College from 1978 to 1986, and also led nonfiction writing workshops at Wesleyan University and Brandeis University. In 1985 at Emerson, he met the composer Virgil Thomson, who became both a friend and mentor. Tommasini published a survey of Thomson's piano music, Virgil Thomson's Musical Portraits (1986), which was a revision and expansion of his 1982 DMA dissertation. He was denied tenure at Emerson College, as the college eliminated his position; Tommasini later noted that although disappointing, "the best thing that ever happened to me was not getting tenure at Emerson, or I might still be there, and none of [my future career] would've happened".
In response, Tommasini turned to music criticism. He was a freelancer, and wrote for The Boston Globe for a decade, beginning in 1986.

Tommasini became a staff writer for The New York Times in 1996, and was promoted to chief classical music critic in 2000. In addition to Thomson, his mentors include Richard Dyer, who was chief classical music critic of The Boston Globe for 33 years. At the Times, Tommasini traveled for important premieres of contemporary classical music, including Saariaho's L'Amour de loin (2000), Adès's The Tempest (2004) and Turnage's Anna Nicole (2011). He covered certain musicians particularly often, such as Peter Serkin, Leif Ove Andsnes, Michael Tilson Thomas and Esa-Pekka Salonen. Tommasini often advocated for increased diversity in the classical music world; his comment that "American orchestras should think a little less about how they play and a little more about what they play and why they play it" is often quoted. In this regard, his colleagues at the Times described him as "something of a provocateur: challenging the field to take more risks, embrace new music and rethink old, hidebound habits". Tommasini's 2020 article which suggested blind auditions be abandoned so race can be considered to assist in diversifying ensembles was met with "intense debate". Tommasini stepped down from his post in 2021; with a 21 year tenure he has been chief classical music critic of The New York Times for the longest period since Olin Downes. In April 2022, music critic Zachary Woolfe was named Tommasini's successor as chief classical music critic for the Times.

Tommasini is the author of Virgil Thomson: Composer on the Aisle, which received the 1998 ASCAP-Deems Taylor Award, and Opera: A Critic's Guide to the 100 Most Important Works and the Best Recordings. Also a pianist, Tommasini made two recordings of music by Virgil Thomson for Northeastern Records, Portraits and Self-Portraits and Mostly About Love: Songs and Vocal Works. Both were funded through grants from the National Endowment for the Arts.

Tommasini lives on Central Park West in Manhattan, New York City with his husband Ben McCommon, who is a psychiatrist. After his leave from the Times at the end of 2021, Tommasini said he might return to teaching, and that he has two further book ideas.

Selected publications

Books
 
 
 
 

Articles

Discography

References

Notes

Citations

Sources

External links
 
 
 Four part interview "Musical Moments" interview with Anthony Tommasini
 
 
 
 

1948 births
People from Long Island
Writers from Brooklyn
Living people
Boston University College of Fine Arts alumni
Yale University alumni
American music critics
Opera critics
Emerson College faculty
Critics employed by The New York Times
Classical music critics
American LGBT writers
20th-century American pianists
LGBT people from New York (state)
American LGBT journalists
American male pianists
21st-century American pianists
20th-century American male musicians
21st-century American male musicians
21st-century American LGBT people